Greenfoot Quarry  is a Site of Special Scientific Interest in the Wear Valley district of west County Durham, England. It is a disused quarry, situated in the Wear valley, 1 km upstream from the village of Stanhope.

The site has national geological importance for its exposures of the Little Whin Sill; there are other exposures in the bed of the Wear near to the quarry, but none shows so complete of an exposure as Greenfoot Quarry. At the western end of the quarry is a unique exposure which displays columnar jointing in the sill with limestone exposed above and below the intrusion.

References

Sites of Special Scientific Interest in County Durham
Quarries in County Durham
Stanhope, County Durham